Owen Lewis, also known as Lewis Owen (28 December 1532 – 14 October 1594) was a Welsh Roman Catholic priest, jurist, administrator and diplomat, who became Bishop of Cassano all'Jonio.

Early life
Born on 28 December 1532 in Wales in the hamlet of Bodeon, Llangadwaladr, Anglesey, he was the son of a freeholder. He became a scholar of Winchester College in 1547, and a perpetual fellow of New College, Oxford, in 1554; and was admitted to the degree of B.C.L. 21 February 1558–59.

Opposed to Protestantism, he left the university about 1561 and went to the University of Douai, where he completed degrees in both law and divinity, and was appointed regius professor of law. He was also made a canon of Cambrai Cathedral, official of the chapter, and archdeacon of Hainaut.

Curialist
A lawsuit of the chapter of Cambrai occasioned Lewis's going to Rome. Popes Sixtus V and Gregory XIII each made him Referendary of both signatures and secretary to the several congregations and consultations concerning the clergy and regulars.

With William Allen, Lewis helped set up the English Colleges of Douai
and Rome. In 1578 he had Morys Clynnog brought in as warden to that in Rome. Nationalist feelings, however, came to the fore and the English students agitated for a Jesuit to be put in charge. This incident has been identified as the beginning of the 'Jesuit and secular' divide in the English mission.

In Milan
Lewis was an administrator in Milan from 1580 to 1584. Charles Borromeo, as archbishop of Milan, brought in outsiders; he appointed Lewis one of the vicars-general of his diocese, at the same time taking him into his family. Borromeo died in Lewis's arms. Gruffydd Robert assisted Lewis in his work.

Later life
Back in Rome, Lewis took on for the Papal Curia policy concerning the English College, Reims and Mary Queen of Scots.

By the joint consent of Sixtus V and Philip II of Spain, Lewis was promoted to the bishopric of Cassano in the Kingdom of Naples on 3 February 1588; and was consecrated at Rome 14 February (N.S.) 1588 by Nicolás de Pellevé, Archbishop of Sens, with Giovanni Battista Albani, Titular Patriarch of Alexandria, and Fabio Biondi, Titular Patriarch of Jerusalem, serving as co-consecrators. At the time of the Spanish Armada there was support for him to be made archbishop of York in the event of the enterprise succeeding, but Allen disapproved of the idea; the proposal became for other bishoprics. Lewis continued to reside at Rome, and the pope appointed him one of the apostolic visitors of that city; and sent him as nuncio to Switzerland.

He died at Rome on 14 October (N.S.) 1594, and was buried in the chapel of the English College, where a monument was erected to his memory, with a Latin epitaph. Lewis's old schoolfellow Thomas Stapleton dedicated to him his Promptuarium Catholicum, Paris, 1595.

Episcopal succession

References

Sources

External links
Profile, Catholic Hierarchy; accessed 24 April 2022.

1532 births
1594 deaths
16th-century Italian Roman Catholic bishops
16th-century Welsh clergy
Bishops of Cassano
Canon law jurists
Diplomats of the Holy See
Fellows of New College, Oxford
16th-century Welsh Roman Catholic priests